Robert Hrubý (born 27 April 1994) is a professional Czech football midfielder currently playing for Jablonec on loan from Ostrava in the Czech First League.

Club career 
He started his career in Slavia Prague. He made his league debut for Slavia Prague on 22 February 2014 in the 5–1 Gambrinus liga away loss against SK Sigma Olomouc. After a series of loans, he moved to Baník Ostrava, then in the second tier of Czech football, in January 2017. He achieved promotion into the top flight with them in June 2017.

International career 
He was first called up to the senior national team in October 2017 for friendly matches against Iceland and Qatar. He made his debut on 8 October against Iceland.

References

External links
 
 

Czech footballers
Czech Republic youth international footballers
Czech Republic international footballers
Czech Republic under-21 international footballers
1994 births
Living people
Czech First League players
SK Slavia Prague players
FC Baník Ostrava players
FK Teplice players
Footballers from Prague
Association football midfielders
FK Jablonec players